The .375 Dakota is dangerous game cartridge designed by Don Allen, the founder of Dakota Arms of Sturgis, South Dakota.

Like the .375 Ruger and the .376 Steyr, the .375 Dakota was designed to compete with the .375 H&H Magnum, yet have the advantage of having a rimless, beltless case and can function through a standard-length rifle action due to a shorter overall length. Like the .375 Remington Ultra Magnum, this cartridge is based on the Canadian Magnum series of rifle cartridges developed by Aubrey White and Noburo Uno, which were based on the .404 Jeffery cartridge. However, unlike the .375 RUM and the .375 Canadian Magnum cartridges which have rebated rims, the Dakota is of a rimless design. Since the .375 Dakota is a proprietary cartridge neither SAAMI or the CIP have provided guidelines or specifications concerning the cartridge.

The .375 Dakota is available in the Dakota Model 76 and Model 97 bolt-action rifles and the Model 10 and Miller single-shot rifles. Both the Model 76 and Model 97 rifles are based on the Winchester pre-'64 Mauser design while the Model 10 and Miller are falling-block rifles.

Performance comparison

See also
List of rifle cartridges

References

 http://www.chuckhawks.com/375Dakota.htm

Pistol and rifle cartridges